Chalon-sur-Saône (literally Chalon on Saône) is a city in the Saône-et-Loire department in the region of Bourgogne-Franche-Comté in eastern France.

It is a sub-prefecture of the department. It is the largest city in the department; however, the department capital is the smaller city of Mâcon.

Geography
It is located on the Saône river, and was once a busy port, acting as a distribution point for local wines which were sent up and down the Saône river and the Canal du Centre, opened in 1792.

History

Ancient times
Though the site (ancient Cabillonum) was a capital of the Aedui and objects of La Tène culture have been retrieved from the bed of the river here, the first mention of Cavillonum is found in Commentarii de Bello Gallico (VII, chs. 42 and 90). The Roman city already served as a river port and hub of road communications, of the Via Agrippa and side routes. 
In 354 AD the Roman Emperor Constantius II stationed the Roman 7th Army in Chalon (then called Cabyllona) for an invasion against the brother kings, Gundomadus and Vadomarius of the Alamanni. However, not having received supplies, the Roman troops revolted, and were pacified by the grand chamberlain Eusebius with money. In Late Antiquity the city had dwindled so much that a wall round it encircled fifteen hectares.

Christian centre

Saint Marcellus of Chalons (Saint Marcel) is said to have been martyred here in 179 AD. Chalon became one of the de facto capitals of the kingdom of Burgundy under Guntram, king from 561 to 592, who died here. Guntram also promoted the cult of Saint Marcellus. It continued to pay for its importance by being frequently attacked until the 10th century. The bishopric of Chalon-sur-Saône, a suffragan of the Archdiocese of Lyon, was also established here in the 6th century, and a Church Council was held here from 644–655. After the French Revolution, in accordance with the Concordat of 1801, the diocese of Chalon was amalgamated with the diocese of Autun, which gave the name to the new entity.

Modern developments
Chalon in the 19th century is best known as the birthplace of photography. Its most famous resident, Nicéphore Niépce, also has a lycée (secondary school) named after him. There is a museum which contains some early photography relics, located on the Quai des Messageries in the town, containing more than two million photographs and many old artefacts such as cameras and other equipment for old and modern photography. Also on display are Niépce's 1807 Pyréolophore, which is probably the world's first internal combustion engine, plus his 1818 implementation of a dandy horse, for which he coined the word vélocipède.

Another famous resident is Dominique Vivant Denon (1747–1825), who was involved in the creation of the Louvre museum, converting the former royal palace into a museum after the French Revolution.

In the late 19th century, copper and iron works were the town's main industry. The large engineering works of Petit-Creusot, a branch of those of Le Creusot, manufactured heavy industrial items.

Population

Economy
The primary industries are nuclear, plastics, metallurgy, and mechanics.
 
The Chamber of Commerce of Saône-et-Loire manages the École de Gestion et de Commerce de Chalon-sur-Saône, as well as the river port on the Saône.
 
There are 2,472 businesses: 764 stores, 454 retail services, 409 schools and health and social services, 378 wholesale services, 122 construction companies, 69 agricultural and alimentary businesses, 64 real estate businesses, 60 transportation business, 49 industries de biens intermédiaires, 35 industries de biens de consommations, 34 entreprises d'énergie, 33 industries de biens d'équipements et 1 industrie automobile.
 
The most important companies are Areva, Saint-Gobain, Nordeon, Cartonnerie Laurent, Chalondis, Carrefour 2000, Géant Casino, Comptoirs des Fers, Cayon, Amazon and Le journal de Saône-et-Loire. Until the early 2000s, Kodak was the largest employer in town. Their production site became the campus of Le Grand Chalon en Bourgogne in 2005.

Transport

Railway
The Gare de Chalon-sur-Saône railway station offers connections with Paris, Dijon, Lyon and several regional destinations.

The station is located along the PLM mainline from Paris Gare de Lyon to Marseille-Saint-Charles, at kilometre post 382.150 from Paris.

Road
The primary national roads serving Chalon are the A6 autoroute from Paris to Lyon, the route nationale 73, from Chalon to Besançon and the route nationale 80, from Chalon to Montchanin.

The city is also located on the pan-European bicycle route the EuroVelo 6, which stretches from Saint-Nazaire on the Atlantic Ocean near Nantes to Constanta on the Black Sea.

Air transport
The closest major commercial airport is Lyon-Saint-Exupéry, located about 120 kilometres away.

Public transport

The public transportation company STAC offers a bus network ZOOM, including a free bus in the center, lines to surrounding communities, and services for disabled riders. There also exists a bike sharing scheme Réflex.

Culture
St. Vincent's Cathedral on the Place Saint-Vincent which, while dating mainly from the 12th to the 15th centuries, has some elements dating from the eighth century and a neo-gothic nineteenth century façade.
 The church of St Pierre, with two steeples, dates from the late 17th century.

The city square also has a number of cafés and a busy market on Fridays and Sundays.

Every year in July, Chalon-sur-Saône hosts an international street artists festival, called Chalon dans la Rue ("Chalon in the street"). Over four days, artists from across Europe and beyond come to the streets of Chalon to perform, mostly for free, in music, theatre, acrobatics, comedy, etc. A program is made available by the town, so people know of the main groups performing, and several newspapers report what performances are must-see and where and when to find them.

Education
An institute of research of the engineering school Arts et Métiers ParisTech was established in Chalon in 1997. This institute offers graduate and doctoral programs in the domain of virtual reality and image engineering.

It includes a municipal library.

Sports
The Élan Chalon basketball club is a member of the LNB Pro A, and plays its home matches at the Le Colisée. Other sports clubes include FC Chalon, HBC Chalon-sur-Saône, Volley-Ball Chalon-sur-Saône and the former RC Chalon.

Personalities
Notable people associated with the city include:
 Joseph Touchemoulin (1727–1801), composer
 Dominique Vivant Denon, involved in creating the Louvre
 Roger Grosjean, double agent in World War II and later a noted archaeologist in Corsica
 Nicéphore Niépce, (1765-1833) pioneer of photography, took the earliest surviving photograph
 Jean Baptiste Félix Descuret, physician and writer
 Omer Letorey (1873–1938), composer

Tourism

 The Arboretum de Pézanin, one of the richest tree collections in France,
 The Rock of Solutré
 Cluny abbey, and its medieval city
 Charolles and the "bœuf charolais"
 Mâcon, Paray-le-Monial

International relations

Chalon-sur-Saône is twinned with:
 Saint Helens, United Kingdom
 Solingen, Germany
 Novara, Italy

See also

 Élan Sportif Chalonnais
 Communes of the Saône-et-Loire department
 Côte Chalonnaise
 Neuilly sa mère !, 2009 film set partially in Chalon-sur-Saône

Notes

References

Westermann, Großer Atlas zur Weltgeschichte

External links
 
 Local web portal www.vivre-a-chalon.com 

 
Communes of Saône-et-Loire
Subprefectures in France
Gallia Lugdunensis
Burgundy